Deer Lake is located in Itasca County, Minnesota about  north of Grand Rapids and about  northeast of Deer River.

Deer Lake is fed by three sources: rainfall, underwater springs, and one inlet from Little Deer Lake.  It belongs to a chain of pristine lakes, feeding Bay Lake - headwaters of the mighty Deer River (namesake of the town) which feeds White Oak Lake (part of the Mississippi River).  Otter, Moose, Little Moose, Fawn, and Cottonwood Lakes also feed Bay Lake.

Often called the "Lake of the Changing Colors", Deer Lake's crystal-clear water displays a wide range of magnificent colors on sunny days - divulging the locations of its perilous rockbars to unfamiliar boaters.  While Deer Lake ranks among the clearest lakes of Minnesota, what distinguishes it from its peers is its many interesting islands.  In 1998, the DNR and Deer Lake Association jointly acquired Bear Island to preserve its undeveloped charm.  Although bears are rarely (if ever) seen on the island, the presence of an inactive eagle's nest in a large white pine makes the island a popular destination for observing wildlife.  Other notable islands include Battleship Island, Star (also known as Picnic) Island, and many others lacking agreed-upon names.

A plethora of wildlife make Deer Lake their abode.  The lake's healthy fish population includes several species of muskie, northern pike, walleye, perch, bluegills, sunfish, rock bass, crappie, and largemouth and smallmouth bass.  On its surface swim several happy loon families, a variety of ducks, and the Canada goose.

Deer Lake is an English translation of the native Ojibwe-language name Waawaashkeshiwi-zaaga'igan, meaning "lake of the deer."

References

External links
Deer Lake Association
 Deer Lake entry on MN DNR Lake Finder

Lakes of Minnesota
Lakes of Itasca County, Minnesota